Krešimir Luetić is a Croatian footballer, currently playing for Hrvace in the Croatian Second Football League as a midfielder.

Club career
Luetić is a product of the youth system of HNK Hajduk Split. He was a part of the junior side that won the Croatian Cup for juniors alongside other promising young Croatian footballers of the time including Nikola Vlašić, Lorenco Šimić, Andrija Balić, Franjo Prce and Ivo Grbić.

In summer 2022, Luetić joined Hrvace from RNK Split.

References

External links
 

1996 births
Living people
Footballers from Split, Croatia
Association football midfielders
Croatian footballers
NK Lučko players
NK Solin players
NK Imotski players
RNK Split players
NK Zagora Unešić players
NK Hrvace players
First Football League (Croatia) players
Second Football League (Croatia) players